Dad Shah Mohammad Pahlavan (also Romanized as Dād Shāh Moḩammad Pahlavān; also known as Dād Shāh and Dādsheh) is a village in Margan Rural District, in the Central District of Hirmand County, Sistan and Baluchestan Province, Iran. At the 2006 census, its population was 110, in 26 families.

References 

Populated places in Hirmand County